Corinne Hérigault (born 6 October 1970 in Créteil) is a former French athlete, who specialised in the long jump.

In 1993, she won the long jump gold medal at the Mediterranean Games, at Narbonne, with a jump of 6.54 m.

She won four French national championship titles in the long jump: one outdoors, in 1993, and three indoors in 1992, 1994 and 1997.

National titles
 French Athletics Championships
Long jump: 1993
 French Indoor Athletics Championships
Long jump: 1992, 1994, 1997

Personal records

References

 Docathlé2003, Fédération française d'athlétisme, 2003, p. 408

External links

1970 births
Living people
Sportspeople from Créteil
French female long jumpers
Mediterranean Games gold medalists for France
Mediterranean Games medalists in athletics
Athletes (track and field) at the 1993 Mediterranean Games